The 2008 Victory Bowl is a college football post-season bowl game.  The game was played on November 21, 2008 at the Hubert H. Humphrey Metrodome in Minneapolis, Minnesota.  The Malone Pioneers from the NAIA played against NCAA Division III .

Malone failed to defend their title as the 2007 Victory Bowl winners on their third consecutive trip to the bowl.  Northwestern's win was their second Victory Bowl championship and fourth appearance in the game's twelve-year history.

Game summary 
Northwestern and Malone University scored a combined 93 points as the Eagles from Northwestern claimed a 49–44 win.  The contest was closely competed and it was not until under a minute remaining was the game’s outcome decided.  Malone held a 28–14 lead midway through the second quarter,  but after that the point differential remained within seven points or less until Northwestern’s Ty Crabtree ran an interception 50 yards for the Eagles’ final score of the game.

References

External links 
 2008 Victory Bowl Photos

Victory Bowl
Victory Bowl
Victory Bowl
Malone Pioneers football bowl games
Northwestern Eagles football bowl games
November 2008 sports events in the United States
Victory Bowl